
The following is a list of Playboy Playmates of 1960.  Playboy magazine names its Playmate of the Month each month throughout the year.

January

Stella Stevens (born Estelle Caro Eggleston; October 1, 1938 – February 17, 2023) was an American film, television and stage actress, who began her acting career in 1959. She is a film producer, director and pin-up girl.  In 1960, Stevens was Playboy magazine's Playmate of the Month for January (and had featured pictorials in 1965 and 1968). Her centerfold was photographed by Frank Schallwig and Don Ornitz.

February

Susie Scott (born August 22, 1938) was Playboy magazine's Playmate of the Month for the February 1960 issue. Her centerfold was photographed by Mario Casilli.

March

Sally Sarell (born June 25, 1938) was Playboy magazine's Playmate of the Month for the March 1960 issue. Her centerfold was photographed by Louis Capuccine. She attended Ohio State University.

April

Linda Gamble (born September 11, 1939) is an American model.  She was Playboy magazine's Playmate of the Month for April 1960.  Her centerfold was photographed by Mario Casilli. She was also the 1961 Playmate of the Year.

May

Ginger Young (born March 11, 1939) is an American model and actress who was Playboy magazine's Playmate of the Month for its May 1960 issue. Her centerfold was photographed by Frank Bez.

June

Delores Marie Wells (October 17, 1937 – February 9, 2016) was an American model and actress.  She was Playboy magazine's Playmate of the Month for its June 1960 issue. Her centerfold was photographed by Don Bronstein.

July

Teddi Smith (born Delilah Henry; September 21, 1942) is an American model.  She was Playboy magazine's Playmate of the Month for the July 1960 issue. Her centerfold was photographed by William Graham and Edmund Leja. After becoming a Playmate, she was a Bunny at the Chicago Playboy Club. Smith appeared on the cover of Playboy five times during the early to mid-1960s.

August

Elaine Paul (born August 11, 1938) is an American model. She was Playboy magazine's Playmate of the Month for its August 1960 issue. Her centerfold was photographed by Frank Eck.

September

Ann Davis (born June 17, 1938) is an American model.  She was Playboy magazine's Playmate of the Month for its September 1960 issue. Her centerfold was photographed by Don Bronstein. Playboy also had several prominent artists, including LeRoy Neiman, produce their own illustrations of Davis for her pictorial.

October

Kathy Douglas (born May 23, 1942) is an American model. She was Playboy magazine's Playmate of the Month for its October 1960 issue. Her centerfold was photographed by Mario Casilli.

November

Joni Mattis (born Joan E. Mattis; November 28, 1938 – September 4, 1999) was an American model.  She was Playboy magazine's Playmate of the Month for its November 1960 issue. Her centerfold was photographed by Jerry White.

Joni Mattis was a young housewife and mother in a troubled marriage when Hugh Hefner helped turn her life around. Ms. Mattis, a longtime friend, personal secretary and assistant to the Playboy magazine founder, who started her career with him in Chicago and eventually became a romantic interest of Hefner.
Hefner said she was in an unhappy marriage and eventually divorced.

Mattis died of cancer in Los Angeles, California, at the age of 60.

December

Carol Eden (born May 19, 1942) is an American model.  She was Playboy magazine's Playmate of the Month for its December 1960 issue. Her centerfold was photographed by William Graham.  Eden's daughter Simone was the Playmate of the Month for February 1989; they thus became the first mother-daughter combination to both become Playboy Playmates.

See also
 List of people in Playboy 1960–69

References

1960-related lists
1960
Playmates Of 1960